Cymatosyrinx is a genus of sea snails, marine gastropod mollusks in the family Drilliidae.

The following species have also been found as fossils in the United States and/or in Mexico in the age range: 37.2 to 0.012 Ma: Cymatosyrinx aclinica Tucker and Wilson 1933 (alternative combination: Cymatosyrinx lunata aclinica), Cymatosyrinx dorseyi Cooke 1926, Cymatosyrinx limatula Conrad 1830 (synonyms: Drillia limatula, Pleurotoma limatula), Cymatosyrinx lunata Lea 1833, Cymatosyrinx magnoliana Olsson 1916, Cymatosyrinx mariana Petuch 1988, Cymatosyrinx perpolita Dall 1890, Cymatosyrinx tiara Gardner 1948, Cymatosyrinx ziczac Gardner 1948.

Description
This genus includes the thin-shelled light-colored species, previously included in Drillia 

The shell is generally short and stout, the spire often very short. The whorls contain nodulous axial ribs, extending over the whole of the volutions. They are generally without spiral sculpture, or, if present, very weak. The aperture is subrhomboidal, very little narrowed below, with a short and broad siphonal canal. The outer lip is arched, with a shallow sinus towards the suture. The inner lipis  large and callous.

Species
Species within the genus Cymatosyrinx include:
 Cymatosyrinx arbela  Dall, 1919
 Cymatosyrinx carpenteri (Verrill & Smith, 1880)
 Cymatosyrinx fritillaria (Dall, 1927)
 Cymatosyrinx idothea Dall, 1919 
 Cymatosyrinx impolita Kuroda, Habe & Oyama, 1971
 Cymatosyrinx johnsoni Arnold, 1903
 Cymatosyrinx nodulosa (Jeffreys, 1882)
 Cymatosyrinx parciplicata (Sowerby III, 1915)
 † Cymatosyrinx ziczac Gardner, 1948 
Species brought into synonymy 
 Cymatosyrinx allyniana Hertlein & Strong, 1951: synonym of Clathrodrillia allyniana (Hertlein & Strong, 1951)
Cymatosyrinx arenensis Hertlein & Strong, 1951: synonym of Elaeocyma arenensis (Hertlein & Strong, 1951)
Cymatosyrinx asaedai Hertlein & Strong, 1951: synonym of Imaclava asaedai (Hertlein & Strong, 1951)
 Cymatosyrinx bartschi Haas, 1941: synonym of Splendrillia bartschi (Haas, 1941)
 Cymatosyrinx centimata Dall, 1889: synonym of Spirotropis centimata (Dall, 1889) 
 Cymatosyrinx ebur Dall, 1927: synonym of Lissodrillia ebur (Dall, 1927)
Cymatosyrinx elissa  Dall, 1919: synonym of Leptadrillia elissa  Dall, 1919
Cymatosyrinx ferminiana  Dall, 1919: synonym of Globidrillia ferminiana  Dall, 1919
 Cymatosyrinx fritillaria Dall, 1927: synonym of Ithycythara fritillaria (Dall, 1927) 
Cymatosyrinx hecuba  Dall, 1919: synonym of Kylix hecuba  Dall, 1919
Cymatosyrinx hemphilli (Stearns, 1871): synonym of Globidrillia hemphillii (Stearns, 1871)
Cymatosyrinx hotei Otuka, 1949: synonym of Imaclava hotei (Otuka, 1949)
Cymatosyrinx lalage  Dall, 1919: synonym of Splendrillia lalage  Dall, 1919
 Cymatosyrinx pagodula Dall, 1889: synonym of Fenimorea pagodula (Dall, 1889) 
Cymatosyrinx palmeri  Dall, 1919: synonym of Calliclava palmeri  Dall, 1919
Cymatosyrinx roseola Hertlein & Strong, 1955: synonym of Drillia roseola (Hertlein & Strong, 1955)
 Cymatosyrinx splendida Bartsch, 1934: synonym of Leptadrillia cookei (E. A. Smith, 1888) 
Cymatosyrinx strohbeeni Hertlein & Strong, 1951: synonym of Globidrillia strohbeeni (Hertlein & Strong, 1951)
 Cymatosyrinx thea Dall, 1884: synonym of Cerodrillia thea (Dall, 1884)

References

 J. A. Gardner. 1948. Mollusca from the Miocene and Lower Pliocene of Virginia and North Carolina: Part 2. Scaphopoda and Gastropoda. United States Geological Survey Professional Paper 199(B):179-310
 E. J. Petuch. 1988. Neogene History of Tropical American Mollusks 1-217

External links
 WMSDB - Worldwide Mollusc Species Data Base: family Drilliidae